Umbar Pada Nandade is a census town in Thane district in the Indian state of Maharashtra.

Demographics
At the 2001 India census, Umbar Pada Nandade had a population of 5689. Males constituted 53% of the population and females 47%. Umbar Pada Nandade had an average literacy rate of 73%, higher than the national average of 59.5%: male literacy was 79% and female literacy is 67%. In Umbar Pada Nandade, 13% of the population were under 6 years of age.

References

Cities and towns in Thane district